The karate competition at the 2014 Central American and Caribbean Games was held in Veracruz, Mexico.

The tournament was scheduled to be held from 27 to 29 November at the Coatzacoalcos Convention Center.

Medal summary

Men's events

Women's events

Medal table

References

External links
Official Website

2014 Central American and Caribbean Games events
2014 in karate
Qualification tournaments for the 2015 Pan American Games
Karate at the Central American and Caribbean Games